David Andersen (19 June 1894 – 24 July 1964) was a Norwegian footballer. He played in nine matches for the Norway national football team from 1912 to 1917.

References

External links
 

1894 births
1964 deaths
Norwegian footballers
Norway international footballers
Association football forwards
Frigg Oslo FK players